Telphusa nephelaspis is a moth of the family Gelechiidae. It is found in north-western India.

The wingspan is about 13 mm. The forewings are whitish sprinkled with dark grey and with a dark grey rounded patch extending over the dorsum from near the base to the middle and reaching three-fourths of the way across the wing, its upper edge including a blackish raised spot. The first discal stigma forms a very oblique black bar, the second a black dot and there are three irregular dark grey spots before the termen and apex. The hindwings are grey, thinly scaled and translucent in the disc and towards the base.

References

Moths described in 1926
Telphusa
Taxa named by Edward Meyrick